Pietro Ridolfi, OFM Conv (died 18 May 1601) was a Roman Catholic prelate who served as Bishop of Senigallia (1591–1601) and Bishop of Venosa (1587–1591).

Biography
Pietro Ridolfi was ordained a friar in the Order of Friars Minor Conventual. On 18 February 1587, he was appointed during the papacy of Pope Sixtus V as Bishop of Venosa.
On 24 February 1587, he was consecrated bishop by Giulio Antonio Santorio, Cardinal-Priest of San Bartolomeo all'Isola, with Stefano Bonucci, Bishop of Arezzo, Annibale Grassi, Bishop Emeritus of Faenza, and Leonard Abel, Titular Bishop of Sidon serving as co-consecrators. 
On 18 February 1591, he was appointed during the papacy of Pope Gregory XIV as Bishop of Senigallia. 
He served as Bishop of Senigallia until his death on 18 May 1601.

Episcopal succession
While bishop, he was the principal co-consecrator of:
Giovanni Battista Bernini, Bishop of Chiron (1587); 
Annibal Pauli, Bishop of Cervia (1587); and 
Camillo Gualandi, Bishop of Cesena (1588).

References

External links and additional sources
 (for Chronology of Bishops) 
 (for Chronology of Bishops) 

16th-century Italian Roman Catholic bishops
17th-century Italian Roman Catholic bishops
Bishops appointed by Pope Sixtus V
Bishops appointed by Pope Gregory XIV
1601 deaths
Conventual Franciscan bishops